Primož Urh-Zupan (born 22 January 1983) is a Slovenian former ski jumper who competed from 1999 to 2005. His best World Cup finish was seventh in a team competition in Kuopio on 25 November 2000.

References

1983 births
Living people
Slovenian male ski jumpers
21st-century Slovenian people